Elaphria subobliqua is a moth of the family Noctuidae. It is found from Mexico to Paraguay and on Jamaica, Cuba and Puerto Rico. It was first reported from Texas in 2004.

The wingspan is about 23 mm.

References

Caradrinini
Moths of North America
Moths of the Caribbean
Moths of Cuba
Moths of Central America
Lepidoptera of Jamaica
Insects of Puerto Rico
Moths described in 1858